Stanton is an unincorporated community located within Readington Township in Hunterdon County, New Jersey, United States. The community dates back to the 17th century and was settled by the Dutch immigrants.  It was originally called Housel's after Johannes Housel, who had a farmstead along Dreahook Road in the mid-18th century.  After the death of William Housel (who started a school in the community), the last owner of the Housel farmstead, it then carried the name of Waggoner's Hill after landowner William Waggoner.  The community took the descriptive name of Mount Pleasant in the early 20th century and would finally become known as Stanton to distinguish it from another Mount Pleasant.  The name "Stanton" was taken from James Logan's Pennsylvania estate: Stenton, which in turn is named for the Scottish village where his father was born.  Logan was a proprietor of West Jersey, a mayor of Philadelphia, and a Chief Justice of the Supreme Court of Pennsylvania.  Logan Way in Readington is named after him, as well as Logan Circle and the Logan neighborhood in Philadelphia and Logan Township in Clinton County, Pennsylvania.  In the 1830s, a Reformed Church and a general store were built. The Stanton Reformed Church still stands today while the Stanton General Store has been converted to an Italian restaurant called the Stanton Italian Table.

Notable people

People who were born in, residents of, or otherwise closely associated with Stanton include:
 Emma Bell (born 1986), actress.
 J. C. Furnas (1906–2001), freelance writer and social historian.
 Howard Lindsey (1889–1968), theatrical producer, playwright, librettist, director and actor.
 William Marchant (1923–1995), playwright and screenwriter, known for writing the play that was remade into the 1957 movie, The Desk Set.
 Dorothy Stickney (1896–1998), Broadway actress.

Climate
The climate in this area is characterized by hot, humid summers and generally mild to cool winters.  According to the Köppen Climate Classification system, Stanton has a humid subtropical climate, abbreviated "Cfa" on climate maps.

References

Unincorporated communities in Readington Township, New Jersey
Unincorporated communities in Hunterdon County, New Jersey
Unincorporated communities in New Jersey
National Register of Historic Places in Hunterdon County, New Jersey
Historic districts on the National Register of Historic Places in New Jersey